Żabnik may refer to:

 Żabnik, Greater Poland Voivodeship
 Żabnik, Opole Voivodeship